Tununa Mercado (born Nilda Mercado) is an Argentine writer. She was born on 25 December 1939 in Cordoba, Argentina. She retained her childhood nickname "Tununa" as her literary pen name. She has written novels, short stories and essays. She has won several literary prizes, including the Sor Juana Ines de la Cruz Prize.

Works
 1967 - Celebrar a la mujer como a una pascua (Cuentos)
 1987 - Antieros (Cuento)
 1988 - Canon de alcoba (Cuentos)
 1990 - En estado de memoria (Novela)
 1994 - La letra de lo mínimo (Ensayo)
 1996 - La madriguera (Novela)
 2003 - Narrar después (Ensayos)
 2005 - Yo nunca te prometí la eternidad (Novela)

References

Argentine women novelists
1939 births
People from Córdoba, Argentina
Living people
20th-century Argentine novelists
21st-century Argentine novelists
20th-century Argentine women writers
20th-century Argentine writers
21st-century Argentine women writers
21st-century Argentine writers